Qual é o Seu Talento? 3 was the third season of Brazilian reality talent show Qual é o Seu Talento?. The season premiered on June 23, 2010.

André Vasco returned as a host from last season and the judging panel again consists of Thomas Roth, Arnaldo Saccomani, Carlos Eduardo Miranda and Cyz Zamorano.

Season 2 fourth place finisher Laura Fontana, the Baby Lady Gaga, make her debut as the show's backstage host.

Singer Igor Martins and Gospel Band Raiz Coral coming out as the winners (a first in the Got Talent series), while gymnastics group Ginasloucos was the runner-up.

Semi-finals

For this season the semi-finals' rules changed, and things became a little bit different. Each semifinal contained six acts split into three different face-offs according to the act's category. The winners for each round would return at the end of the episode for the judges to decide who would go to the final.

Key

Part 1

First Air Date: Oct 27, 2010

Part 2

First Air Date: Nov 03, 2010

Part 3

First Air Date: Nov 10, 2010

Part 4

First Air Date: Nov 17, 2010

Part 5

First Air Date: Nov 24, 2010

Part 6

First Air Date: Dec 01, 2010

Part 7

First Air Date: Dec 08, 2010

Final

The final took place on December 15, 2010 and was a 90-minute special. Each judge had to buzzed out one out of the seven remaining acts until only the final three remaining. Singer Igor Martins and Gospel Band Raiz Coral coming out as the winners (a first in the Got Talent series), while gymnastics group Ginasloucos was the runner-up.

Finalists

(ages stated at time of contest)

Elimination Chart

References

External links
 Qual é o Seu Talento? Official website
 

2010 Brazilian television seasons
Season 03

pt:Qual é o Seu Talento?